SWEB Energy, formerly South Western Electricity Board (SWEB) was a British state-owned regional electricity company operating in South West England which was privatised by the Thatcher government. Although sold many times, the 'SWEB' brand name survived until 2006.

The distribution network operator for the former SWEB area is now Western Power Distribution. The incumbent electricity retail company is EDF Energy.

South Western Electricity Board (SWEB) 

The board was responsible for the purchase of electricity from the electricity generator (the Central Electricity Generating Board from 1958) and its distribution and sale of electricity to customers. The key people on the board were: Chairman A.N. Irens (1964, 1967), Deputy Chairman S.F.C. Whitmore (1964, 1967), and full-time member C.E. Knight (1964, 1967).

The total number of customers supplied by the board over its operational life was:

The amount of electricity, in GWh, sold by South Western Electricity Board was:

Company timeline
In 1990, SWEB Energy was formed from the privatisation of the South Western Electricity Board.

In 1995, SWEB Energy was bought by the American utility Southern Company.

In 1999, the company was bought by the PPL Corporation distribution company Western Power Distribution and was split into two. Western Power itself (officially known as WPD South West) dealt with the local distribution, metering and substations, and the 'SWEB' brand name was continued as a retail energy utility.

In June 1999, SWEB was sold to French-owned EDF Energy. The acquisition was authorised by the European Commission in Jul.1999. EDF discontinued the 'SWEB' brand name on 5 June 2006.

References

External links
 EDF Energy's Fuel Mix for 2006
HISTELEC NEWS, South Western Electricity Historical Society documents

Electric power companies of the United Kingdom
Former nationalised industries of the United Kingdom
Utilities of the United Kingdom